The Da Água Morta River is a river on the border between São Paulo and Paraná states in southern Brazil.

See also
List of rivers of Paraná
List of rivers of São Paulo

References

Rivers of Paraná (state)